The flag of Peru was adopted by the government of Peru in 1824, and modified in 1950. According to the article 49 of the Constitution of Peru, it is a vertical triband with red outer bands and a single white middle band. Depending on its use, it may be defaced with different emblems, and has different names. Flag day in Peru is celebrated on 7 June, the anniversary of the Battle of Arica.

Design and symbolism

Coat of arms

Meaning of the colors
Red represents the blood that was spilled for the fight.
White represents Purity and Peace. However, the colours are also linked to the parihuanas, a red and white type of flamingo that General San Martín dreamed about during the revolution.

Colour approximations
The current colors of the Peruvian flag were taken of the design of San Martín and Torre Tagle. The reasons why red and white were chosen are unknown.

Official tones determined by Peruvian laws do not exist. However, there are some particular initiatives in approximated equivalents in multiple color models, some in tones close to crimson.

At official level, the governmental communications have used diverse shades of red.

Variants

Civil Flag
The civil flag or ensign is used by citizens. It has no additions to the common form. It was changed several times; before 1950 it looked like the current national flag and was used as both the civil and the state flag, when General  removed the coat of arms from the flag and created the state and war flags. The Civil flag lacks coat of arms.

State flag
The state flag, used by state institutions, is marked with the coat of arms. It is used during ceremonies in which the National Flag is hoisted in the presence of spectators (as opposed to a static, permanent flag). A form of this flag, the national standard is used indoors by official and private institutions. It is used for the Government Palace, the United Nations, etc. It is also used by the Peru national football team.

War flag
The war flag, similar to the state flag, is marked with the national shield. It is flown by the Peruvian military and national police, and is typically inscribed with the service, name and number of the unit flying it.

Naval jack
The naval jack is not based on the triband; it is a square flag, consisting of a white square with the coat of arms on a red field. It is used on warships, usually with the ensign of the highest-ranking officer on board above it.

History

Proposed flag of 1820 

During the Viceroyalty of Peru, the colonial-era Spanish flag flew over Peru. In 1820, during the struggle for independence, British-born General William Miller hoisted in Tacna the first flag that represented the emerging country. Though the original flag itself is now lost, it was described as navy blue, defaced with a golden sun representing Inti.

Flag of 1820 

The first flag of the Republic of Peru was created by General José de San Martín, and officially decreed on 21 October 1820. It is diagonally quartered, with white upper and lower fields, and the others red. The flag was defaced with an oval-shaped laurel crown in the center, surrounding a sun rising behind mountains by the sea. The symbolism of the flag's colors is uncertain, but according to Peruvian author Abraham Valdelomar, San Martín, having arrived on the coast of southern Pisco, was inspired by the colors of parihuanas, red-and-white flamingos. Historians of the early Peruvian Republic, such as Leguía y Martínez and Pareja Paz Soldán, give a different explanation, suggesting that San Martín took the red from the flag of Chile and the white from the flag of Argentina, recognizing the provenance of the men of the liberation army. Historian Jorge Fernández Stoll thinks in 1820 San Martin was in favor of a constitutional monarchy, and he chose to use monarchical symbols and colors: Castile used the red and white colors for many years, the old flag of the viceroyalty the cross of Burgundy was red and white and the flag's diagonal lines mimicked the cross shape, the red color was the royal symbol of the mascaipacha of Inca kings and of the ensign of the Spanish king at that time.  The flag proved difficult to adopt due to its complex construction; without standardized measurements in place at the time, a triangular flag proved difficult to build.

Flag of March 1822 

In March 1822, José Bernardo de Tagle, Marquis of Torre Tagle and Supreme Delegate of the Republic, who replaced San Martín provisionally when the latter traveled to Guayaquil, decreed a new design for the flag. This consisted of a horizontal triband, with a white band between two red ones, and a golden Inti at the center, similar to the flag of Argentina. This modification was justified, according to Torre Tagle, by the inconvenience in the construction of the previous version, among other issues.

A problem came up on the battlefields: the resemblance with the Spanish flag, especially from far away, made the distinction between the armies difficult, which led to a new change to the flag.

Flag of May 1822 

On 31 May 1822, Torre Tagle changed the flag's design again. The new version was a vertical triband, with red outer bands and a white middle band, with a golden sun representing Inti at the center.

Flag of 1825 

On 25 February 1825, during Simón Bolívar's administration, the Constituent Congress changed the design of the flag by promulgating the law of national symbols. The fundamental change was the image of the sun for the brand new coat of arms, designed by José Gregorio Paredes and Francisco Javier Cortés.

In this way, the flag was definitely constituted by two vertical bands of red at the ends and white at the center, with the coat of arms at the center of the middle band.

Flags of the Peru-Bolivian Confederation era, 1836–1839 

From 1836 to 1839, Peru was temporarily dissolved into the Republics of South Peru and North Peru, which joined Bolivia to form the Peru–Bolivian Confederation.

The South was formed first, thus adopting a new flag: a red vertical band on the left, with a golden sun and four small stars above (representing Arequipa, Ayacucho, Cuzco and Puno, the four groups of the republic), and the right side divided into an upper green band and a lower white one. The North kept the currency and all of the dissolved Peru, including its flag.

The flag of the Peru-Bolivian Confederation showed the coats of arms of Bolivia, South and North Peru, from left to right and slanted at different angles, on a red field, adorned by a laurel crown.

After the dissolution of the Confederation, the old Republic of Peru was restored to its 1836 composition, as were its national symbols.

Flag of 1950 
In 1950, President Odría modified the national flag to its current form, removing the coat of arms from the civil flag, since it was used de facto, being easier to make. The national ensign and war flag were created for exclusive uses, each with a variant of the coat of arms, which was also changed slightly. These remain as the official flags today.

The Marcha de Banderas
The Marcha de Banderas (Spanish: March of Flags) is a military march sung during the flag raising. It was created in 1897 by SM Jose Sabas Libornio Ibarra who said President Nicolás de Piérola, he disagreed with the indiscriminate interpretation of the National Anthem at all official events that were derived from civic events. In December of that year was officially recognized to be executed in any official act.

In all occasions today the song is sung in its entirety, formerly during the presidency of Alan Garcia only the first 3 were sung.

See also
List of flags of Peru
Coat of arms of Peru
National Anthem of Peru
Great Military Parade (Peru)
Flag of Canada
Flag of Austria, similar design with horizontal stripes

References

External links

 
 Peruvian flag history
 Peru Flag at Flagscorner.com 

 
Peru
Peru
National symbols of Peru